Whiteville may refer to a place in the United States:

 Whiteville, Louisiana
 Whiteville, North Carolina
 Whiteville, Tennessee
 Whiteville, Virginia